Marc Erik Elias (born February 1, 1969) is an American Democratic Party elections lawyer. In 2021, he left his position as a partner at Perkins Coie to start the Elias Law Group.

Elias served as general counsel for the Hillary Clinton 2016 presidential campaign and John Kerry 2004 presidential campaign. In 2020 and 2021, on behalf of the Biden campaign and the Democratic National Committee, Elias oversaw the state-by-state response to lawsuits filed by the Trump campaign contesting the 2020 presidential election results. Of the 64 cases, he won all but one minor case, which was later overturned in his favor. 

In 2020, he founded Democracy Docket, a website focused on voting rights and election litigation in the United States.

Early life and education
Born to a Jewish family in New York City, Elias was raised in Suffern, New York. He earned a Bachelor of Arts in government in 1990 from Hamilton College, at which he attended a class taught by Bernie Sanders. He then earned a master's degree in political science from Duke University and a Juris Doctor from Duke University School of Law.

Career
In 2004, Elias served as general counsel to John Kerry's presidential campaign.

Prior to creating the Elias Law Group in 2021, Elias was the head of the political law practice at Perkins Coie. He represented the Democratic National Committee, Democratic Senatorial Campaign Committee, Democratic Congressional Campaign Committee, Democratic Governors Association, and a number of Democratic members of Congress. He has represented the leadership of the United States House of Representatives and United States Senate.

He served as lead counsel for Senator Al Franken in the 2008 United States Senate election in Minnesota recount and contest, the longest recount and contest in American history. Elias has testified on campaign finance before committees in both houses of Congress and before the Federal Election Commission. Elias has worked on voting rights and redistricting lawsuits across the U.S.

In April 2015, Hillary Clinton engaged Elias as attorney of record and general counsel for her 2016 presidential campaign. According to The Washington Post, in April 2016, Elias hired Fusion GPS on behalf of the Democratic National Committee and the Clinton campaign to create the research that resulted in the Steele dossier. On October 24, 2017, Perkins Coie released Fusion GPS from its client confidentiality obligation.

Elias serves on the board of advisors of Let America Vote, an organization founded by former Missouri Secretary of State Jason Kander that aims to end voter suppression.

Elias served as the attorney for Dan McCready during the investigation of fraud allegations in the 2018 election in North Carolina's 9th congressional district. In January 2019, Elias became general counsel of the Kamala Harris 2020 presidential campaign.

Following the 2020 presidential election, Elias supervised the response to dozens of lawsuits filed by the Donald Trump campaign seeking to overturn Biden's win. Out of 65 such court cases, Elias prevailed in 64. In 2021, as several Republican-dominated state legislatures passed laws to tighten election procedures and voting requirements, Elias filed suits challenging the new laws, often within hours of the bills being signed. Writing in The Hill, Reid Wilson described Elias as "the most prominent Democratic attorney in America" and "the Democrats' last best hope of preserving a House majority".

On March 12, 2021, a three-judge panel of the 5th Circuit Court of Appeals issued sanctions on Elias and other Perkins Coie attorneys for "redundant and misleading" motions related to a case in which Elias and his legal team argued that the elimination of straight-ticket voting in Texas disproportionately affected minorities. In the ruling, the court stated that Elias and his team "did not notify the court that their latest motion to supplement the record filed on February 10, 2021, was nearly identical to the motion to supplement the record filed several months ago by the same attorneys, on September 29, 2020". After the ruling, Perkins Coie defended Elias's actions. In December 2021, Elias asked the full court to reconsider the panel's decision. His attorney Paul Clement claimed that the panel's action was unprecedented and Elias had made good-faith mistakes rather than engaged in egregious misconduct for which appellate courts typically impose sanctions. The court has broad authority to oversee the attorneys who appear before it. The motion was denied by the appeals court.

According to The American Lawyer, Elias has gained a reputation for "strident election and voting rights litigation on behalf of the Democratic Party". In 2020, Elias's employer, Perkins Coie, received $9.6 million from the Hopewell Fund and $11.6 million from Priorities USA Action. Elias led a Hopewell Fund project called the Democracy Docket Legal Fund that filed lawsuits to block Republican voting legislation.

Elias's tactics have been criticized by legal scholar Richard L. Hasen who has written a blog post outlining the differences in approaches to defending election law Hasen and Elias had previously disagreed on legal tactics.

On May 18, 2022, Elias was called to testify by prosecutors for special counsel John Durham  at the trial of his former law partner Michael Sussmann, who had been charged with making a false statement to FBI general counsel James Baker during a meeting they had in September 2016. Elias acknowledged hiring Fusion GPS to conduct opposition research against Clinton's opponent Donald Trump, asserting it was part of a larger effort to protect the Clinton campaign from possible libel suits from Trump or others. He said that in representing high-profile political figures, he hired firms that could ensure confidentiality to avoid leaks than might damage his clients. The Durham prosecution called Elias to testify at the outset of the trial, apparently to reinforce what it contended was an effort by Sussmann and the Clinton campaign to draw FBI and press attention to potential communications between computer servers at the Russian Alfa-Bank and the Trump Organization.

Bibliography
 With Jonathan S. Berkon for the Harvard Law Review: "After McCutcheon" about the Supreme Court of the United States ruling on McCutcheon v. FEC
 "Political Regulation: Justified Reform or a Burden on Free Speech" an article about the increase in political spending since 2000 due to changes in campaign finance law.
 "Even Judges Can't Follow Campaign Finance Laws" an assessment on the trial for David Rosen (politics) where Elias asserted that "The Rosen trial confirmed one of the dirty little secrets of the campaign finance laws — they are so complicated that virtually no one in politics fully understands them."

References

External links
 Elias Law Group

Hillary Clinton
Duke University School of Law alumni
Hamilton College (New York) alumni
Living people
Political campaign staff
Jewish American attorneys
1969 births
People associated with Perkins Coie
20th-century American lawyers
21st-century American lawyers